Mark Hall is a former defensive end in the National Football League.

Biography
Hall was born on August 21, 1965 in Morgan City, Louisiana.

Career
Hall was drafted by the Green Bay Packers in the seventh round of the 1989 NFL Draft and spent two seasons with the team. He played at the collegiate level at the University of Southwestern Louisiana and Louisiana State University.

See also
List of Green Bay Packers players

References

People from Morgan City, Louisiana
Green Bay Packers players
American football defensive ends
Louisiana Ragin' Cajuns football players
LSU Tigers football players
Mississippi Gulf Coast Bulldogs football players
Players of American football from Louisiana
1965 births
Living people